Pine Township is a civil township of Montcalm County in the U.S. state of Michigan. The population was 1,870 according to the 2020 census.

Geography

Demographics
At the 2000 census there were 1,654 people, 610 households and 466 families residing in the township. The racial makeup was 97.52% White, 0.18% African American, 0.60% Native American, 0.12% Asian, 0.48% Pacific Islander, 0.12% from other races, and 0.97% from two or more races. Hispanic or Latino of any race were 0.85% of the population.

There were 610 households, of which 33.8% had children under the age of 18 living with them, 67.5% were married couples living together, 4.4% had a female householder with no husband present, and 23.6% were non-families. 19.7% of all households were made up of individuals, and 6.6% had someone living alone who was 65 years of age or older.  The average household size was 2.71 and the average family size was 3.05.

27.9% of the population were under the age of 18, 6.8% from 18 to 24, 29.3% from 25 to 44, 26.3% from 45 to 64, and 9.7% who were 65 years of age or older. The median age was 37 years. For every 100 females, there were 107.0 males. For every 100 females age 18 and over, there were 104.8 males.

The median household income was $41,583 and the median family income was $46,042. Males had a median income of $36,037 and females $22,216. The per capita income was $17,381. About 4.8% of families and 8.5% of the population were below the poverty line, including 13.1% of those under age 18 and 7.2% of those age 65 or over.

References

Townships in Montcalm County, Michigan
Townships in Michigan